This is a list of clubs that play Australian rules football in Australian Capital Territory at the senior level.
Guide to abbreviations: 
FC = Football Club
AFC = Australian Football Club (mainly used if in Queensland or NSW or outside Australia) / Amateur Football Club (mainly used in the other Australian States)
ARFC = Australian Rules Football Club

State Level

AFL Canberra

Metropolitan / Country Level

AFL Canberra

Division 1
Ainslie Football Club
Belconnen Magpies Football Club
Eastlake Football Club
Queanbeyan Football Club
Sydney Swans Football Club
Tuggeranong Hawks Football Club
Division 2
Ainslie Football Club
Belconnen Magpies Football Club
Eastlake Football Club
Queanbeyan Football Club
Tuggeranong Hawks Football Club
Division 3
ADFA Football Club
Ainslie Football Club
ANU Football Club
Belconnen Magpies Football Club
Eastlake Football Club
Gungahlin Football Club
Harman Football Club
Murrumbidgee Football Club
Tuggeranong Hawks Football Club
Woden Blues Football Club
Division 4
ADFA Football Club
ANU Football Club
Belconnen Magpies Football Club
Cooma Football Club
Cootamundra Football Club
Eastlake Football Club
Goulburn City Swans Football Club
Gungahlin Football Club
Harman Football Club
Murrumbidgee Football Club
Yass Football Club

Australia clubs